Mepron is the brand name for a time-released, rumen-protected DL-Methionine capsule for dairy cattle. It is a registered trademark of Evonik Industries.

Product 

The product is a 1.8 mm x 3 mm, nearly-white cylindrical granule. The granules are free-flowing, and nearly insoluble in water. The product is nearly dust-free, and has a high level of durability. It is coated in ethylcellulose, a rugged and durable fiber. Mepron is also heat- and pH-tolerant, and has a long shelf life.

Uses 

Dairy-herd milk production may be limited by the amino acid methionine; therefore, the amino acid is included in cattle rations to provide a well-balanced diet. Normally a cow receives 10-20 grams of Mepron per day, depending on performance and ration composition. According to a 2006 study, results "suggest that RPM [rumen-protected methionine] may be needed to improve milk production in Holstein cows with a mean production of 35 kg d-1 milk, fed with [a] diet based on alfalfa and corn silage. The optimum response was obtained with [the] addition of 16 g d-1 of ruminally protected methionine. Further studies are needed to determine if cows may respond to lysine supply once the methionine requirements are met."

Safety 

Mepron can be handled safely and is non-toxic, according to EU chemicals legislation.

References

External links 

 Mepron website
 RP Nutrients
 Methionine
 Amino acids for dairy cattle
 Mepron Specifications

Veterinary drugs
Dairy farming